Norapat is a former town in the Armavir Province of Armenia. The town is now part of Armavir.

See also 
Armavir Province

References 

World-Gazetteer.com

Populated places in Armavir Province